The Emirates American Football League is an American Football non-professional league for amateurs based in the United Arab Emirates.

History 

Founded in 2012 by former Canadian Football League player Dustin Cherniawski, and couple Patrick Campos and Julie Teperow from the now defunct American Football Academy in Dubai, the organization promoted itself as a channel of American Football in the U.A.E by "providing a safe and structured environment where players from ages 8 and up can engage in full contact American Football."

It is currently the only organization supporting and promoting American football in the U.A.E. It conducts training and conditions sessions for players but also hosts an annual tournament called the 'Desert Bowl'.

Desert Bowl

The Desert Bowl is the annual American football tournament held by the league. In a regular season, various teams regularly play matches against each other. Following the conclusion of the regular season, the teams play against each other in a single-elimination playoffs tournament called the Desert Bowl.

Teams 

The EAFL consists of 7 active teams;
 Dubai Stallions
 Dubai Barracudas
 Al Ain Desert Foxes
 Abu Dhabi Capitals
 Abu Dhabi Scorpions
 Dubai Sand Vipers
 Abu Dhabi Wildcats

Venues 

Matches for the league are played at various venues, spread across the U.A.E; past and current venues include :
 Dubai Sevens
 Dubai Sports City
 Zayed Sports City 
Practices for the league have been held primarily at Dubai American Academy for the 2017-2018 season.

References 

American football in Asia
Sports leagues in the United Arab Emirates
2012 establishments in the United Arab Emirates